Gold Leaf is a 2021 Taiwanese period drama based on the eponymous novel written by Huang Kuo-hua. Set in the 1950s, Gold Leaf is Taiwan's first Hailu Hakka language drama.

Directed by Lin Chun-yang, the series stars Cindy Lien, James Wen, Kuo Tzu-chien, Hsu An-chi, Hsueh Shih-ling, Li Hsing, and Jag Huang.

It received 16 nominations at the 57th Golden Bell Awards and went on to win the Best Supporting Actress in a Television Series (Sophia Li) and the Best Editing for a Drama Series.

Synopsis
Gold Leaf depicts the booming tea trade in Taiwan during the 1950s, following the travails of Chang Yi-hsin and her family owned tea exporting company.

Cast
 Cindy Lien as Chang Yi-hsin
 James Wen as Liu Kun-kai
 Kuo Tzu-chien as Chang Fu-chi
 Hsu An-chi as Luo Shan-mei
 Hsueh Shih-ling as Fan Wen-gui
 Sophia Li as Hsia Mu-hsueh
 Jag Huang as Chin Yuan-kai

Controversy
The drama drew controversy for misrepresenting the creation of the New Taiwan dollar (NTD), by incorrectly depicting a scene in which American advisors recommended that Taiwanese officials adopt the NTD to address hyper-inflation in the country, when in reality, the Kuomintang-led government adopted the currency of their own volition. The drama's production team issued a joint statement for misrepresenting these historical facts.

References

External links
 
 
 

2021 Taiwanese television series debuts
2021 Taiwanese television series endings
Taiwanese drama television series
Chinese-language television shows
Mandarin-language television shows
Hokkien-language television shows
Television series set in the 1950s
Television shows filmed in Taiwan
Hakka-language television shows
Shanghainese-language television shows
Works about agriculture
Agriculture in Taiwan
Works about tea
Taiwanese tea
Hsinchu County